A torus bundle, in the sub-field of geometric topology in mathematics, is a kind of surface bundle over the circle, which in turn is a class of three-manifolds.

Construction
To obtain a torus bundle: let  be an orientation-preserving homeomorphism of the two-dimensional torus  to itself. Then the three-manifold  is obtained by
 gluing one component of the boundary of the resulting manifold to the other boundary component via the map .

Then  is the torus bundle with monodromy .

Examples
For example, if  is the identity map (i.e., the map which fixes every point of the torus) then the resulting torus bundle  is the three-torus: the Cartesian product of three circles.

Seeing the possible kinds of torus bundles in more detail requires an understanding of William Thurston's geometrization program. Briefly, if  is finite order, then the manifold  has Euclidean geometry. If  is a power of a Dehn twist then  has Nil geometry. Finally, if  is an Anosov map then the resulting three-manifold has Sol geometry.

References

Fiber bundles
Geometric topology
3-manifolds